Sterling Creek is a river located in Herkimer County in the U.S. State of New York. It flows into the Mohawk River east-southeast of the Hamlet of West Schuyler.

Hydrology
Aquatic life, recreation uses, and natural resources habitat are stressed in Sterling Creek due to habitat modifications and resulting silt and sediment deposits in the stream. A macroinverebrate assessment of Sterling Creek near the mouth was conducted in 2000, which showed slightly impacted conditions.

References 

Rivers of Herkimer County, New York
Mohawk River
Rivers of New York (state)